Merlin Liburd (born 15 November 1969) is a Nevisian cricketer. He played in twelve first-class and sixteen List A matches for the Leeward Islands from 1994 to 1999.

See also
 List of Leeward Islands first-class cricketers

References

External links
 

1969 births
Living people
Nevisian cricketers
Leeward Islands cricketers